Harry Kay or Kaye may refer to:

Harry Kay (psychologist)
Harry Kay (footballer), English footballer
Harry Kaye, footballer

See also
Harold Kay (actor), French actor
Harold Kay (footballer), English footballer
Harold Kaye, cricketer
Henry Kaye (disambiguation)